Klassi Ghalina & The History of the World is a 2018 Maltese comedy film directed by Alan Cassar and starring the cast of the series Klassi Ghalina, which started airing on the Maltese television station ONE in 2011.

Synopsis 
In this film, Mr. Xrieha and the students go back in time, where they meet Adam and Eve, Romeo and Juliet and experience the Great Siege of Malta, amongst other mishaps. Before this film, in 2017, Alan Cassar wrote and directed Klassi Ghalina: Mission to Moscow. After Klassi Ghalina & The History of the World, Cassar wrote and directed Klassi Ghalina vs Dracula, which was released in 2020.

Cast 

Ray Attard as Mr. Xrieha 

Trevor Mizzi as Terrence 

Andy Catania as Gino Bugeja 

Manuel Cucciardi as Teddy Lagana 

Raissa Sammut as Whitney Smith Farrugia 

Marco Grech as Giocondo

Jovana Kuzeljevic as Meggie 

Rainer Cassar as Zeppi

Mario Gatt as Spiru 

Xylon Bristow as Daiton

Charles Nova as tas-7.15

Maria Cassar Inguanez as Lola Grech

Dominic Aquilina as Head Master Busietta

J.J Curmi as Hufta

Jason Curmi as Marci l-Purtinar

Oliver Pace as Hopleaf 

Dione Galea as Pirate Captain

Clint Grech as Pirate Ship Captain

Thea Montanaro as Eve / Juliet

Sean Galea as Adam / Romeo

Sharon Aquilina as Secretary

Romina Genuis as Miss Borg

Gino Lombardi as La Vallette

Release 
The film was released in Malta on December 12, 2018. It premiered in Galleria Cinemas.

External links 

 Summary by Radio Times

References 

2018 films
2018 comedy films
Maltese comedy films